Detention is a 2003 American action film directed by Sidney J. Furie. It stars Alex Karzis as Chester Lamb and Dolph Lundgren as Sam Decker, a high school teacher who is about to retire and has one more detention to proctor. Sam, on the other hand, must unite the troublemakers and outcasts in detention to defeat the criminals and survive because the drug runners have chosen to attack the school.

Plot

A teacher who cares is not welcome at Hamilton High School. Former soldier, Sam Decker, is a teacher who does not care anymore. He is giving up. He returned to his inner-city neighborhood after serving in the military in the former Yugoslavia and the Gulf War to teach at the toughest school in town. He needed to make a difference at Hamilton High.

Sam submits his resignation because he is dissatisfied and enraged by a system that does not work. However, on the day he does, he performs one final detention duty with the school's most difficult students. Everyone is having a bad day.

However, Hamilton High is about to become a very real battlefield when a well-organized group of murderers with automatic weapons and explosives invades the school after hours to hide $300 million worth of heroin that they have hijacked. The strategy is to prepare two police cars at the school's auto shop, hide the drugs in hidden compartments, and drive away safely.

The invaders, led by brilliant but cruel Chester Lamb, are surprised to find that Sam and the kids from the detention room are still inside the school.

The hunt is on as Lamb's henchmen relentlessly follow the teacher and students through the school's hallways and classrooms while Lamb watches them on the surveillance cameras and uses the security system against his prey.

Sam and the kids work together to defeat the armed robbers and thwart Lamb's meticulously planned crime. They come across a sinister plot that includes the police department and even the highest levels of government along the way.

School security guards and paid local police were supposed to ensure that the school was empty after hours. However, Sam and his juvenile offenders were not considered by anyone.

Gloria Waylon (Kata Dobó), the punks Viktor (Joseph Scoren), and Alek (Anthony J. Mifsud), all members of Lamb's crew, continue to stalk the students throughout the school.

However, Sam still has some tricks to show the kids and some lessons to learn from them. The lesson for tonight at Hamilton High School is survival.

Cast

 Dolph Lundgren as Sam Decker
 Alex Karzis as Chester Lamb
 Kata Dobó as Gloria Waylon 
 Corey Sevier as Mick Ashton 
 Dov Tiefenbach as Willy Lopez 
 K.C. Collins as "Hogie" Hogarth (as Chris Collins) 
 Mpho Koaho as Jay Tee Barrow 
 Larry Day as Earl Hendorf
 Shawn Roberts as Corey Washington
 Jennifer Baxter as Margo Conroy
 Nicole Dicker as Charlee Tuckle
 Richard Yearwood as Leon
 Joseph Scoren as Viktor
 Anthony J. Mifsud as Alek
 Roy Lewis as Lyle Nesson
 Dan Willmott as Sergeant Phil Axel
 Joseph Griffin as Phil Macer

References

External links 
 Official Website
 Detention at the Russian
 
 
 

2003 films
2000s pregnancy films
2000s English-language films
2000s Hungarian-language films
2003 action films
Films directed by Sidney J. Furie
Teenage pregnancy in film
American high school films
2000s teen films
2000s American films